Smolov is a Russian masculine surname, its feminine counterpart is Smolova. The surname is derived from the Russian word смола (smola, meaning "resin"). It may refer to:

Fyodor Smolov (born 1990), Russian football player
Polina Smolova (born 1980), Belarusian pop singer
Sybil Smolova, Czech-Austrian dancer and film actress of the silent era

See also
Smolov Squat Routine, a weight training program 

Russian-language surnames